= 1940 United States Virgin Islands general election =

- November 5, 1940
- St. Thomas–St. John Municipal Council
	Majority party	Minority party
Party	Progressive Guide	People's Civic League
Total seats	6 seats	1 seat
Total votes	3,292	1,011
- St. Croix Municipal Council
Party	Independent Ticket	People's Party	Others
Total seats	3 seats	1 seats	5 seats

Elections were held on the islands of St. Thomas and St. John in the United States Virgin Islands on November 5, 1940, to elect 7 members of the Municipal Council. The Progressive Guide won in a landslide, electing 6 of the 7 members. The People's Civic League only won one seat, St. John, as the Progressive Guide did not contest it. Elections were also held in St. Croix to elect 9 members to their own Municipal Council.

== St. Thomas–St. John results ==
=== At-large district ===
1940 St. Thomas–St. John Municipal Council election (at-large district)
Party	Candidate	Votes	%
Progressive	Ralph Paiewonsky	891	40.06%
Progressive	Omar Brown	858	38.58%
People's	George Audain	303	13.62%
People's	Jose Gimenez	172	7.73%
Total votes		2,224	100%

=== St. Thomas – Town district ===
1940 St. Thomas–St. John Municipal Council election (St. Thomas – Town district)
Party	Candidate	Votes	%
Progressive	Osmond Kean	698	41.04%
Progressive	Valdemar Hill	637	37.45%
People's	David Monsanto	245	14.40%
People's	Reginald Davis	121	7.11%
Total votes		1,701	100%

=== St. Thomas – Country district ===
1940 St. Thomas–St. John Municipal Council election (St. Thomas – Country district)
Party	Candidate	Votes	%
Progressive	Roy Gordon	107	34.30%
Progressive	Harry de Lagarde	101	32.37%
People's	Weymouth Rhymer	56	17.95%
People's	Herbert Joshua	48	15.39%
Total votes		312	100%

=== St. John district ===
1940 St. Thomas–St. John Municipal Council election (St. John district)
Party	Candidate	Votes	%
People's	Julius Sprauve	66	100%
Total votes		66	100%

== St. Croix results ==
=== At-large district ===
1940 St. Croix Municipal Council election (at-large district)
Party	Candidate	Votes	%
Other	D. Hamilton Jackson	972	100%
Total votes		972	100%

=== Christiansted Town district ===
1940 St. Croix Municipal Council election (Christiansted Town district)
Party	Candidate	Votes	%
People's	Eric Carroll	413	100%
Independent Ticket	Joseph Alexander	356	100%
Independent Ticket	Sebastion Forbes	317	100%
Total votes		1,086	100%

=== Christiansted Country district ===
1940 St. Croix Municipal Council election (Christiansted Country district)
Party	Candidate	Votes	%
Independent Ticket	William L. Johansen	?	?%
Independent Ticket	Cornelius Pentheny	?	?%
Other	Reuel Scholten Brady	?	?%
Total votes		?	100%

=== Frederiksted Town district ===
1940 St. Croix Municipal Council election (Frederiksted Town district)
Party	Candidate	Votes	%
Other	Frederick Dorsch	?	?%
Other	Selwyn Fleming	?	?%
Total votes		?	100%

=== Frederiksted Country district ===
1940 St. Croix Municipal Council election (Frederiksted Country district)
Party	Candidate	Votes	%
Other	Isaac Boynes	137	45.07%
Other	Percy Gardine	88	28.95%
Other	Paul Joseph	79	25.99%
Total votes		304	100%
